Da'Monte Williams (born November 2, 1998) is an American college basketball player who played college basketball for the Illinois Fighting Illini of the Big Ten Conference.

High school career
Williams played his high school career at Manual High School, playing on varsity all four years. As a junior, Williams averaged 15.3 points, 5.9 rebounds, 2.3 assists, and 2.1 steals a game as he helped lead Manual into third-place at the IHSA Class 3A State Championship. Individually, Williams was awarded the Associated Press 3A All-State First-Team, the Illinois Basketball Coaches Association Class 3A/4A All-State First-team, the Champaign News-Gazette Second-team All-State, and the Peoria Journal-Star All-Area Co-Player of the Year. However, William's high school career came to an abrupt end after he tore his ACL in the fourth game of season. Williams signed his National Letter of Intent on November 9, 2016.

Recruiting
On February 28, 2016, Williams verbally committed to play Illinois and John Groce over offers from high-major schools like Indiana and Cincinnati. In March 2018, Williams remained committed to playing for Illinois after Brad Underwood was hired to replace Groce as head coach.

College career
In his freshman year, Williams played in every game but one and started three times, averaging 3.5 points, 2.9 rebounds, and 1.1 assists a game. In his sophomore year, he played in every game and made 18 starts, averaging 3.4 points, 3.5 rebounds, and 1.2 assists per game. In his junior year, Williams established himself more as a defender even though his average points were down to 2.8 points a game, he guarded players from the one to four position. In his senior year, he was unanimously voted as captain of the Illini along with Ayo Dosunmu. In this season, Williams averaged 5.5 points, 5.3 rebounds, and 1.7 assists a game, all career highs. Moreover, his advanced stats were up as he set career highs in 15.1 PER and 10.0 box plus/minus. This was mostly likely due to his defensive contributions and his efficiency from three-point range as he shot 54.7%, which lead the nation for players that attempted at least two shots a games. With the NCAA granting an extra year of eligibility due to the COVID-19 pandemic in the United States, Williams returned to play for Illinois for a fifth year. He played in all 33 games, starting 30, and averaged 3.9 points, 5.0 rebounds, and 2.5 assists a game. Moreover, with 159 games, Williams set the school record for the most career games.

Personal life
Williams is the son of former NBA and Illinois basketball player Frank Williams. Williams is currently majoring in sociology.

Career statistics

College

|-
| style="text-align:left;"| 2017–18
| style="text-align:left;"| Illinois
| 31 || 3 || 16.9 || .337 || .225 || .705 || 2.9 || 1.1 || .7 || .1 || 3.5
|-
| style="text-align:left;"| 2018–19
| style="text-align:left;"| Illinois
| 33 || 18 || 21.5 || .344 || .317 || .700 || 3.5 || 1.2 || .8 || .2 || 3.4
|-
| style="text-align:left;"| 2019–20
| style="text-align:left;"| Illinois
| 31 || 22 || 21.6 || .347 || .283 || .700 || 3.6 || 1.3 || .7 || .4 || 2.8
|-
| style="text-align:left;"| 2020–21
| style="text-align:left;"| Illinois
| 31 || 17 || 24.9 || .515 || .547 || .681 || 5.3 || 1.7 || .8 || .3 || 5.5
|-
| style="text-align:left;"| 2021–22
| style="text-align:left;"| Illinois
| 33 || 30 || 28.8 || .307 || .325 || .531 || 5.0 || 2.5 || .8 || .3 || 3.9
|- class="sortbottom"
| style="text-align:center;" colspan="2"| Career
| 159 || 90 || 22.8 || .366 || .354 || .670 || 4.1 || 1.6 || .8 || .3 || 3.8

References 

Illinois Fighting Illini men's basketball players
Basketball players from Illinois
1998 births
Living people